The canton of Le Haut Agenais Périgord is an administrative division of the Lot-et-Garonne department, southwestern France. It was created at the French canton reorganisation which came into effect in March 2015. Its seat is in Monflanquin.

It consists of the following communes:
 
Beaugas
Boudy-de-Beauregard
Bournel
Cancon
Castelnaud-de-Gratecambe
Dévillac
Doudrac
Gavaudun
Lacaussade
Laussou
Mazières-Naresse
Monbahus
Monflanquin
Monségur
Montagnac-sur-Lède
Montaut
Monviel
Moulinet
Pailloles
Parranquet
Paulhiac
Rayet
Rives
Saint-Aubin
Saint-Étienne-de-Villeréal
Saint-Eutrope-de-Born
Saint-Martin-de-Villeréal
Saint-Maurice-de-Lestapel
Salles
La Sauvetat-sur-Lède
Savignac-sur-Leyze
Tourliac
Villeréal

References

Cantons of Lot-et-Garonne